Kitasatospora misakiensis is a bacterium species from the genus of Kitasatospora which has been isolated from soil in Japan. Kitasatospora misakiensis produces tubermycin A, tubermycin B, misakimycin and the endothelin receptor antagonist BE-18257B.

Further reading

References

External links
Type strain of Streptomyces misakiensis at BacDive -  the Bacterial Diversity Metadatabase

Streptomycineae
Bacteria described in 1961